Barezil (also Romanized as Bārezīl; also known as Bāzerīl) is a village in Dasht Rural District, in the Central District of Meshgin Shahr County, Ardabil Province, Iran. At the 2006 census, its population was 465, in 117 families.

References 

Tageo

Towns and villages in Meshgin Shahr County